The 1992 Overseas Final was the twelfth running of the Overseas Final as part of the qualification for the 1992 Speedway World Championship Final to be held in Wrocław, Poland. The 1992 Final was held at the Brandon Stadium in Coventry, England on 14 June and was the second last qualifying round for Commonwealth and American riders.

The Top 9 riders from the Overseas Final qualified for the World Semi-final's. England's Gary Havelock won the meeting and later in Poland became the first Overseas Final winner to go on and win the World Championship. Havelock also became the first English rider since Michael Lee in 1980 to win speedway's ultimate individual prize.

1992 Overseas Final
14 June
 Coventry, Brandon Stadium
Qualification: Top 9 plus 1 reserve to the World Semi-final

References

See also
 Motorcycle Speedway

1992
World Individual